The Colony is a city in Denton County, Texas, United States, and a suburb of Dallas. The population was 44,534 at the 2020 census.

History
The Colony derives its name from the original Peters Colony. The Peters Colony headquarters was located within the current boundaries of The Colony in the historical community of Stewartsville and the site of the Hedgcoxe War. The Colony is also the site of Bridges Settlement (established during the years of the Republic of Texas and the oldest community in Denton County), Stewarts Creek, Rector, Stoverville and Camey, also known as Camey Spur.

One of the oldest portions of The Colony is Bridges Cemetery, established in 1857 on land owned by the Bridges family, is found on Morningstar Drive. The cemetery gates stand closed to the public except during certain dates when it is open to visitors by the local history committee.

The Colony did not exist before 1973, when home developers Fox and Jacobs (which became part of Centex) purchased  located around State Highway 121 and Farm to Market Road 423. The name "The Colony" was chosen by Fox and Jacobs because they wanted its new development to share a sense of kinship with Texas' early history and "to create a living monument to the spirit and courage of the Peters Colonists ... those men and women who braved considerable hardships to begin new lives, in new homes, on new land." They planned the development to be a new "dream city" consisting primarily of single-family homes grouped as a "colony" and based on the city of Dallas' infrastructure specifications. In 1973, Fox and Jacobs negotiated an agreement with the city of Frisco to begin construction in its extraterritorial jurisdiction. In 1974, street construction began with many streets being named after early settlers and members of the construction crews. The first model homes were completed in August 1974 and the first families moved into their homes in October that year. The homes were served for water services by The Colony Municipal Utility District formed in 1974, electricity via Texas Power and Light, cable television via Lakeside CATV and telephone service via Southwestern Bell.

In 1977, the homeowners associations' petition to disannex the development from the city of Frisco's extraterritorial jurisdiction was approved. The Colony voted to become an incorporated city in January 1977 and became a Home Rule City in 1979. Residents of The Colony participated in two polls to select a name for the new city. Both polls chose the name "The Colony" and the name was ratified by the City Council in May 1977. In 1987, The Colony voted to merge with the small lakeside community of Eastvale.

Geography
The Colony is located at  (33.090874, –96.884659).

The city is bordered on the west by Lewisville Lake and the city of Lewisville, on the north and east by Frisco, and on the south by the cities of Carrollton and Plano. Approximately  of shoreline on Lewisville Lake (including two peninsulas) are contained within the city's boundaries, thus providing the basis for the city's nickname "City by the Lake."

Demographics

According to the 2020 United States census, there were 44,534 people, 17,401 households, and 10,957 families residing in the city. In 2017, there were 41,388 people. The racial makeup of the city was 74.6% White, 11.2% African American, 5.3% Asian, 0.4% Native American, 5.1% from other races, and 3.4% from two or more races. Hispanic or Latino of any race were 19.2% of the population. In 2020, the racial and ethnic makeup was 53.2% non-Hispanic white, 9,73% African American, 0.37% Native American, 8.78% Asian, 0.07% Pacific Islander, 0.41% some other race, 4.92% multiracial, and 22.52% Hispanic or Latino of any race.

Politics
The Colony is a home rule municipality with a council-manager form of government. It has a six-member council, with two members elected at large, as well as a city mayor. All meetings of the City Council are open to the public, and meetings are broadcast live on Time Warner Cable government access Channel 16, AT&T Uverse channel 99, as well as on the broadcast page of The Colony's website.

In November 2021, Richard Boyer ran unopposed to become mayor of The Colony, succeeding Joe McCourry who had been mayor of The Colony for 11 years.

Council members

The Colony has several Boards and Commissions, all of which list their current members, Term expiration dates, and meeting minutes on The Colony's website. Meetings usually have time setup in the agenda for Citizen input which can be submitted by email or presented in person at most board's meetings. Board applications are available on The Colony's website or at City Hall and a list of currently vacant positions can be found on the site as well.

Education 
The Colony is located inside both the Lewisville Independent School District (LISD) and Little Elm Independent School District.

Lewisville ISD has built six elementary schools, two middle schools and one high school inside the city limits. The elementary schools are Peters Colony Elementary, Camey Elementary, B.B. Owen Elementary, Stewart's Creek Elementary (retired 2020–2021), Ethridge Elementary, and Morningside Elementary. The two middle schools are Griffin Middle School and Lakeview Middle School.

Little Elm ISD built Prestwick STEM Academy in 2014, which serves K–8 in The Tribute subdivision, as well as Strike Middle school (opened Fall of 2020) which also serves the residents from The Tribute subdivision. Strike Middle School is named after former superintendent Dr. Lowell H. Strike who served the district for three years.

During a December 2020 meeting of the LISD Board, several changes were made, including rezoning the area and a closure of one of the elementary schools. Effective the end of the 2020–2021 school year, the LISD board voted to close Stewart's Creek Elementary. Many of the students affected by the rezoning will be attending the new school LISD is building to service the area opening for the 2021–2022 school year, dubbed by the LISD Board as Memorial Elementary – STEM Academy. There were three written-in names submitted by the community with no clear winner of the LISD Naming Survey: Sterling (The school's chosen descriptor of students), Cox (name of B.B. Owen Elementary's influential coach and teacher, and supporter of the annual Kids Chase by the Lake ), and Josey Lane (The street the school is on). LISD chose to name the school Memorial elementary instead of the submitted names because "...having a Memorial Elementary School will allow us to have the opportunity to memorialize, if you will, a number of important and influential people in the communities we serve.”

Owing to its original history as part of Frisco, The Colony is located inside the community college district of Collin College, unlike most other places in Denton County. However, since residents of The Colony do not pay taxes to said district they must pay out-of-county tuition rates to attend the college.

In May 2009, Griffin Middle School student and The Colony resident Eric Yang won the National Geographic Bee, beating out 54 other state competition champions to win a scholarship and travel package valued at more than $25,000.

The Colony High School is located just north of Texas State Highway 121 on Blair Oaks Drive.

Transportation
Main lanes: Sam Rayburn Tollway
Service roads: State Highway 121
Farm to Market Road 423

References

External links
City of The Colony official website
The Colony Business Directory
The Colony Economic Development Corporation
The Colony Community Development Corporation
The Colony Convention & Visitors Bureau
The Colony Public Library
The Colony Chamber of Commerce
TheColony.org

Dallas–Fort Worth metroplex
Cities in Denton County, Texas
Cities in Texas
Populated places established in 1969
1969 establishments in Texas